Lorenzo Pasinelli (September 4, 1629 – March 4, 1700) was an Italian painter active mainly in Bologna during the late Baroque period.

He was born in Bologna, and initially trained in the studio of Simone Cantarini. He then pursued studies in Rome. Despite that training, his works have an air of Mannerism. In an overview of two major Bolognese painters circa 1700, one author describes that Pasinelli:

Lorenzo liked the design of Raphael joined with the charm of Paolo Veronese; while Carlo (Cignani) liked the grace of Correggio united to the erudition of Annibale (Carracci) ... while Pisanelli did not attain a fullness of correct design, which (Veronese) had advanced ... no one will fail to recognize in Pisanelli large picturesque fire and great new ideas, but sometimes is a tad forced in his movements, and using new and bizarre clothes.

He collaborated after 1648 with Flaminio Torre. He is known to have painted a Miracle of St. Anthony for the church of San Francesco (now found in San Petronio) He painted for the local Senatore Francesco Ghisilieri a Love disarmed by the nymphs of Diana, now found in the Pinacoteca BPER of Modena. Attributed to Pasinelli, in the same collection is an atypical, almost genre-like allegory of a Young Girl with an Open Cage. He painted a Holy Family and a Resurrection of the dead for the church of San Francesco in Bologna. He also painted Christ's Entry into Jerusalem and a Christ's return from Purgatory for the former Certosa of Bologna.

His pupils included Gian Antonio Burrini, Gioseffo dal Sole, Giovanni Pietro Zanotti, Giuseppe Maria Mazza, Antonio Lorenzini, and Donato Creti.

References

 
 Artnet biography from Grove encyclopedia of Art.
 
 Artcyclopedia entry

External links

1629 births
1700 deaths
17th-century Italian painters
Italian male painters
18th-century Italian painters
Painters from Bologna
Italian Baroque painters
18th-century Italian male artists